Arctic Slope Regional Corporation, or ASRC, is one of 13 Alaska Native Regional Corporations created under the Alaska Native Claims Settlement Act of 1971 (ANCSA) in settlement of aboriginal land claims. ASRC was incorporated in Alaska on June 22, 1972.  Headquartered in Utqiaġvik, Alaska, with administrative offices in Anchorage, ASRC was as of 2017, a for-profit corporation with nearly 11,000 Alaska Native shareholders primarily of Inupiat Eskimo descent.

History 
Arctic Slope Regional Corporation was created under the Alaska Native Claims Settlement Act of 1971.
The initial shareholders were the 13,000 Iñupiaq Eskimos listed in the 1970 US census. 
Since April 1990 ASRC’s shareholder base grew from 3,700 shareholders in 1972 to about 13,000.

Operations
ASRC is a private for profit corporation, with headquarters in Utqiaġvik, Alaska, and administrative offices in Anchorage. As of 2023, ASRC had 15,000 employees in Alaska and the lower US.

It consists of the following different subsidiaries :

ASRC Federal
ASRC Federal consists of 19 companies, with more than 7,000 employees in over 40 states across the U.S., which contract U.S. Federal government services , Thesef companies deliver engineering, information technology, infrastructure support, professional and technical services to civil, defense and intelligence agencies: namely ASRC Federal Agile Decision Sciences, ASRC Federal Analytical Services, ASRC Federal Astronautics, ASRC Federal Communications, ASRC Federal Cyber, ASRC Federal Data Network Technologies, ASRC Federal Data Networx, ASRC Federal Data Solutions, ASRC Federal Data Networks Corporation, ASRC Federal Field Services, ASRC Federal InuTeq, ASRC Federal Mission Services, ASRC Federal Mission Solutions, ASRC Federal Primus, ASRC Federal Research and Technology Solutions, ASRC Federal Space and Defense, ASRC Federal System Solutions, ASRC Federal Technical Services, and ASRC Federal Vistronix.

Petroleum Refining
ASRC owns Petro Star Inc., the only Alaskan-owned refining and fuel marketing operation in Alaska with 2 refineries along the Trans-Alaska Pipeline System: the North Pole Refinery and Valdez refinery. It owns the North Pacific Fuel and Sourdough Fuel brands.

Oil field services 
ASRC Energy Services and Little Red Services provide oil field services and employ 2,300 Alaskans alone. They provide hot-oil service, inspecting and flushing oil well tubing and surface lines with fluids to remove accumulated deposits

ASRC Industrial
ASRC Industrial is based in Tempe, Arizona and comprises three operating groups: 1) Maintenance, Mechanical and Specialty Services, 2) Cleaning, Demolition and Remediation and 3) Engineering, Inspection and Professional Services. These are delivered by 24 companies.

ASRC Building
ASRC Construction’s services fall into four categories: buildings, civil and infrastructure and building materials, delivered by 4 different companies.

Others
Eskimos, Inc. is a fuel and automotive parts distributor and Top of the World Hotel,a hotel  which operates Tundra Tours, Inc. tour programs.

Resource development
ASRC is one of the largest private landowners in Alaska, with ownership in fee simple of 5 million acres of land. ASRC has a royalty position in the Colville River (Alaska) Unit (CRU), home of the Alpine, Alaska oil field. Alpine field production peaked in November 2005, but as of 2012 CRU satellite developments account for nearly a quarter of the oil production at the Alpine site. Production started in the fourth quarter of 2015 from the new CD-5 drill site, located to access both the Nanuq Kuparuk and the Alpine Participating Areas. Additionally, in late 2015 the Bureau of Land Management issued the remaining outstanding permits providing for development of the Greater Mooses Tooth 1 (GMT1) development. ASRC is the majority subsurface owner for the initial GMT1 development located eight miles west of CD-5.

Corporate governance
ASRC is served by a 15-member board of directors. Seven of the members are residents of Wainwright, Point Lay, Point Hope, Nuiqsut, Anaktuvuk Pass, Atqasuk and Kaktovik, five are from Utqiaġvik, and three are “At Large” seats.

As of 2023 executive officers were Rex A. Rock Sr., President and CEO, and Butch Lincoln, Executive VP, Chief Operating Officer, Charlie Kozak, Executive VP, Chief Financial Officer and Crawford PatkotakExecutive VP, Stakeholder Engagement. Rock and Lincoln earned nearly 18 million US$ in 2021.

Revenue
After ASRC was created in 1971, it received a share of the $963 million provided by the Alaska Native Claims Settlement Act, plus a number of acres of land in proportion to the size of villages in its region. It was able to define and obtain title to parcels of land without restriction to any former title or land claim. It engaged experts to identify land with significant potential for petroleum, timber, fish, game, and tourist development. Its lands include half of the 429 million-barrel Alpine Oil Field, which started production in 2001.

In 2015, its gross revenue was $2.5 billion. Since inception, it has delivered over $915 million as dividends to shareholders.  

Since 2000, it has distributed $90 million to support socioeconomic opportunities in the area, including scholarships and training programs to qualified Iñupiat.

Ranking
In 2016, ASRC was ranked as the fourth best of 92 oil, gas, and mining companies on indigenous rights in the Arctic.

In 2021, ASRC was ranked as no. 14 most environmentally responsible company out of 120 oil, gas, and mining companies involved in resource extraction north of the Arctic Circle in the Arctic Environmental Responsibility Index.

References

External links
 

1972 establishments in Alaska
Alaska Native regional corporations
Arctic Slope region
Culture of the Arctic
Real estate companies established in 1972
Conglomerate companies established in 1972